Deadlock II: Shrine Wars is a science fiction turn-based strategy video game developed by Cyberlore Studios and published by Accolade, released on February 25, 1998 as a sequel to Deadlock: Planetary Conquest. The game allows the player to play as the leader of an alien species who controls colonies on a planet's surface.

Tommo purchased the rights to this game and digitally publishes it through its Retroism brand in 2015.

Overview
Deadlock II: Shrine Wars features turn-based gameplay that takes place on a planet map that ranges from around 1 to 9000 tiles, each presenting a region, or area of building. Players take control of each territory by colonizing it with a "Colonizer" vehicle or taking it from another player through military conquest. Each territory consists of a six-by-six grid in which buildings can be placed. Like most strategy games, Deadlock II: Shrine Wars uses natural resources and credits to pay for new units and buildings. Colonists are assigned to buildings to generate resources and research. These new units and buildings are able to be created after their prerequisite technologies are researched.

Comparison to Deadlock: Planetary Conquest
As a sequel, the most notable features in Deadlock II are
A single-player campaign
A fully customized interface as opposed to the Windows desktop controls used in the original
Additional gameplay elements such as diplomatic alliances, more researchable technologies, more units, more buildings, and the ability to create a city on water.

Criticism
Aside from changes in the interface, Deadlock II uses exactly the same graphics from the first game.
No major changes in gameplay
No new species
The newer interface with its fixed (low) resolution and primitive graphics did not age well. Because the original game used desktop controls, its graphics actually appear cleaner on modern systems.
Deadlock II can be construed as a "deluxe" version of the original game rather than a proper sequel. Aside from the single-player campaign, which is little more than a collection of non-random scenarios, players who have already played out the original game have little more to see in this sequel.

Species
Deadlock II: Shrine Wars features seven alien species each with their own strengths and weaknesses. The racial abilities are not as pronounced as they are in other strategy games such as Warcraft but can still greatly affect the way in which each species is played.

ChCh-t
The ChCh-t are a species of insect-beings resembling mantises and scorpions. They have a hive mind with most activity revolving around the queen of each individual hive. The ChCh-t excel in construction so units and buildings are produced faster. The ChCh-t produce colonists faster and their housing units hold twice as many colonists. They suffer from slow researchers and weak military units but all military units are faster. ChCh-t scouts can steal resources from enemy colonies.

Cyth
The Cyth are a species of humanoids. They are very in tuned to their psychic abilities, to the point where some Cyth no longer need to walk but use their psychic abilities to hover a few inches off the ground. This trait is enhanced by ingesting the juice of the egg sac of a spider from their home planet, which the Cyth do constantly through a face mask that almost all Cyth can be seen wearing. They are often regarded as “evil” which makes it difficult for them to form alliances with the other species. Their leader is identified as the Veil Lord. Their command corps can use a “Mind Blast” technique that mangles enemy units. Cyth scouts can poison enemy territories which cuts that territory's food production by half. Their morale is always fixed at 90%; this effectively prevents a tenth of the population from ever doing work, but enables the use of practices that would cause morale-lowering scandals with other species (such as oppressive taxation or black market dealings).

Maug
The Maug are a species (at least now) of half-living, half-machine humanoids. After having been forced off their home planet by the Cyth, Maug DNA was drastically altered by the radiation given off by the sun of their home in exile. This caused the entire Maug species to become sickly. Even newly born Maug suffered genetic disorders and diseases. Even the healthiest of the species suffer from a cold throughout most of their life. The Maug are a very technological species. They have designed special suits that help make up for their physical handicaps. These handicaps make their military units weak but they make up for it with the rapid production of all units and short research times. Maug scouts can sabotage enemy units and steal technology. Most Maug are constantly depressed which makes them very sensitive to morale changes.

Tarth
Tarth have evolved on Korga, a world extremely hostile to organic life, only one third the size of Jupiter. Thus, they are large (about 180 centimeters wide, height and weight not specified), lumbering behemoths with a thick, orange hide covered in scale-like plates. The modern Tarth society was founded by Guh, who started his life a warrior, and finished it an astronomer. Guh had been severely injured in battle and was preparing to die, when his gaze fell on one of the seven natural satellites of his planet – Tunt. As he watched, a volcano erupted on Tunt. Cloud formations visibly changed. Fascinated, Guh regained his will to live and limped back to his comrades. He later became a hermit and constructed his planet's first telescope, discovering life on Tunt. A few centuries later, Tarth mastered space travel and created a colony on Tunt. They made contact with the Cyth and helped them create the Quadra Alliance. A titanic statue of Guh can be found in the capital of the Tarth empire. The monument shows him impaled on a spear, watching the heavens through his telescope. 

Tarth infantry, artillery, and defense fortifications all have attack bonuses. Their infantry units employ a juggernaut battle order that crumbles buildings quickly. Also Tarth farms produce high amounts of food. Tarth scouts make poor spies and are often caught. Their ships are also very weak and can sink easily.

Humans
The humans portrayed in Deadlock are the same physiologically as modern man, but more technologically advanced. As a result of a massive stock market crash, many were forced to leave Earth in search of wealth. The humans generate more in tax revenue than all the other species, but are more susceptible to Skirineen scandals. Their command corps can order a berserk command which will greatly multiply the strength of combat units in battle, but will kill them afterwards.

Re'lu
The Re'lu are a culturally advanced species (at least through their perspective) of light-green humanoids. The Re'lu are odd in that each member of the species is composed of two organisms: the Re'ites, or humanoid components; and the Luæ'ites, a brown beast that accompanies each Re'ite. The two organisms share a psychic bond, and the Re'ites are able to send distracting thoughts their way, which Lu'ites apparently enjoy. Their command corps have the ability to convert enemy units to their side during battle. They also have the ability to view enemy territories through ESP.

The Re'lu have a long-standing disdain for humans, who they view as culturally inferior. This came as a result to their initial visits to Earth as holograms and the violent reception they were given. Re'lu and humans enjoy arguing over things ranging from the most efficient way to govern to proper pet care.

Uva Mosk
The Uva Mosk are a species of shamanistic beings loosely resembling Humans. The leader of the Uva Mosk is called the Grand Hortus, who leads them on a path of harmony with the planet. Their ability to produce food is second only to the Tarth, but their production of other resources is the highest in the game. Their spies are very adept at camouflage, making them the best spies in the game.

Reception

The game received average reviews according to the review aggregation website GameRankings. Next Generation called it "a decent game, but unfortunately the addition of Net play and a new interface hardly seem to justify the release of a new product, or its purchase."

References

External links

1998 video games
Accolade (company) games
4X video games
Multiplayer and single-player video games
Turn-based strategy video games
Video game sequels
Video games developed in the United States
Video games with isometric graphics
Windows games
Windows-only games
Cyberlore Studios games
Tommo games